Ophiodon is a genus of marine ray-finned fishes belonging to the family Hexagrammidae, the greenlings. It is found in the northeastern Pacific Ocean.

Species
Ophiodon has one extant species and one known extinct species:

 Ophiodon elongatus Girard, 1854 (Lingcod)
 Ophiodon ozymandias Jordan, 1907

References

Hexagrammidae
Ray-finned fish genera